The East Caribbean Common Market (ECCM) was established by Dominica, Grenada, Montserrat, and St. Lucia in 1968. It was joined by St. Vincent (1979), St. Kitts and Nevis (1980) and Antigua and Barbuda (1981).

The ECCM was replaced by the Organisation of Eastern Caribbean States (OECS).

References 

International organizations based in the Americas
Trade blocs